Diospyros oocarpa, is a tree in the Ebony family, native to Central and North Malanad of Central Sahyadri of Western Ghats and Sri Lanka. Sometimes, it is classified as a synonym of Diospyros marmorata.

Common names
 Tamil: Vellai karankali,  
 Sinhala: Kalu-kadumberiya (කලු කැඩුම්බේරිය)
 Malayalam: Karunkali

Ecology

References

External links
Indiabiodiversity.org
Plants.jstor.org
Uses.planetnet-project.org

oocarpa
Flora of Sri Lanka